McAdams (also known as Montour No. 9) is an unincorporated community in Robinson Township, Washington County, Pennsylvania, United States. The community is a coal town which was the site of the Pittsburgh Coal Company's Montour No. 9 mine, which closed in 1954. The Montour Trail passes through the community, as did a branch of the Montour Railroad during the mine's operation.

References

Unincorporated communities in Washington County, Pennsylvania
Coal towns in Pennsylvania
Unincorporated communities in Pennsylvania